Jim Powell (born 17 May 1949 in London) is a British novelist, and is a direct descendant of the 19th-century novelist Thomas Love Peacock.

Education
Jim Powell was educated at Charterhouse School and Trinity Hall, Cambridge, where he has a master's degree in history. He stood as a candidate for the Conservative Party against Geoffrey Robinson in the Coventry North-West constituency in the British General Election of 1987.

Publications
Jim Powell's first novel, The Breaking of Eggs, was published in 2010. It deals with the impact of fascism and communism on 20th-century Europe. The novel was longlisted for the Desmond Elliott Prize for first novels. It was reviewed in The New Zealand Herald. Powell's second novel, Trading Futures, was published in 2016, and his third novel, Things We Nearly Knew, in 2018.

References

External links
  Jim Powell website

21st-century English novelists
1949 births
Living people
People educated at Charterhouse School
Alumni of Trinity Hall, Cambridge
Conservative Party (UK) parliamentary candidates
English male novelists
21st-century English male writers